Hannibal Lokumbe (born Marvin Peterson on November 11, 1948) is an American jazz trumpeter.

Career
A native of Smithville, Texas, United States, he is sometimes known by the name "Hannibal". He attended high school in Texas City, Texas and was in the High School band under Mr. Renfroe, a respected band director. Marvin’s playing and practicing his trumpet was enjoyed in his neighborhood. In the late 1960s, he attended North Texas State University for two years, then moved to New York City and went on tour with Rahsaan Roland Kirk. He became a member of the Gil Evans orchestra, an association that lasted through the 1980s, and worked with Roy Haynes and Pharoah Sanders. As the leader of the Sunrise Orchestra, he played koto and trumpet. His debut solo album, Children of the Fire, was released in 1974.

Awards and honors
Fellow Award in Music from United States Artists, 2009

Discography

As leader
 Marvin Peterson and the Soulmasters in Concert (Century, 1969)
 Children of the Fire (Sunrise, 1974)
 Hannibal (BASF/MPS, 1975)
 In Antibes (Enja, 1977)
 In Berlin (MPS, 1977)
 Naima (Eastworld, 1978)
 The Light (Eastworld, 1978)
 Live in Lausanne (Eastworld, 1978)
 The Tribe (John Hammond World of Jazz 1978)
 Tribute (Eastworld, 1979)
 The Universe Is Not for Sale (Smackdab, 1980)
 The Angels of Atlanta (Enja, 1981)
 Poem Song (Mole, 1981)
 More Sightings (Enja, 1984)
 Visions of a New World (Atlantic, 1989)
 Kiss On the Bridge (Ear-Rational, 1990)
 Crossing (Ear-Rational, 1991)
 One with the Wind (Muse, 1994)
 African Portraits (Teldec, 1995)
 Dear Mrs. Parks (Naxos, 2009)
 Can You Hear God Crying? (Naxos, 2014)

As sideman
With Andrew Cyrille
 My Friend Louis (DIW, 1992)

With Richard Davis
 Epistrophy & Now's the Time (Muse, 1972)
 Dealin' (Muse, 1973)

With Gil Evans
 Where Flamingos Fly (Artists House, 1971 [1989])
 Masabumi Kikuchi + Gil Evans (Philips, 1972); Japanese big band directed by Gil Evans
 Svengali (Atlantic, 1973)
 The Gil Evans Orchestra Plays the Music of Jimi Hendrix (RCA, 1974)
 There Comes a Time (RCA, 1975)
 Priestess (Antilles, 1977)
 Gil Evans Live at the Royal Festival Hall London 1978 (RCA, 1979)
 Live at the Public Theater (New York 1980) (Trio, 1981)
 Live at Sweet Basil (Gramavision, 1984 [1986])
 Live at Sweet Basil Vol. 2 (1984)

With Frank Foster
 The Loud Minority (Mainstream, 1972)

With Kip Hanrahan
 Desire Develops An Edge (Yellowbird, 1983)

With Billy Hart
 Enchance (Horizon, 1977)

With Roy Haynes
 Hip Ensemble (Mainstream, 1971)
 Senyah (Mainstream, 1973)

With Elvin Jones
 Live at the Village Vanguard (Enja, 1968)

With Eric Kloss
 Essence (Muse, 1974)

With Grachan Moncur III & Jazz Composer's Orchestra
 Echoes of Prayer (JCOA, 1974)

With New York Unit
 Now's the Time (Paddle Wheel, 1992)
 Akari (Apollon, 1994)

With Don Pullen
 Tomorrow's Promises (Atlantic, 1977)

With Pharoah Sanders
 Black Unity (Impulse!, 1971)
 Live at the East (Impulse!, 1972)
 Village of the Pharoahs (Impulse!, 1973)

References

External links
 Official Website
 Article from New York Times
 

African-American classical composers
American classical composers
African-American male classical composers
American male classical composers
American jazz trumpeters
American male trumpeters
Atlantic Records artists
Enja Records artists
MPS Records artists
Muse Records artists
People from Smithville, Texas
University of North Texas College of Music alumni
Living people
1948 births
21st-century trumpeters
Jazz musicians from Texas
Classical musicians from Texas
21st-century American male musicians
American male jazz musicians
21st-century African-American musicians
20th-century African-American people